Snowboarding at the 2019 Winter Universiade was held at the Sopka Cluster from 3 to 10 March 2019.

Men's events

Women's events

Medal table

References

External links
Results
Results Book – Snowboard

 
Snowboarding
Winter Universiade
2019